Li Xinyu (born 21 August 1996), formerly known as Li Zheng, is a Chinese footballer currently playing as a goalkeeper for Liaoning Shenyang Urban.

Club career
Li Xinyu would go abroad to Portugal to start his professional career with Gondomar and especially the Gondomar B team before returning to China with Tianjin TEDA on loan and then a permanent move with second tier club Meizhou Hakka, where he would make his debut in a 2018 Chinese FA Cup game on 11 April 2018 against Hainan Boying that ended in a defeat on penalties after a 0-0 draw. He would be utilized as a reserve choice goalkeeper and be part of the squad that gained promotion to the top tier after coming second within the division at the end of the 2021 China League One campaign. 

He would join another second tier club in Liaoning Shenyang Urban on 27 April 2022 and would make his debut for them in a league game on 5 August 2022 against Shijiazhuang Gongfu in a 2-1 defeat.

Career statistics
.

References

External links

1996 births
Living people
Sportspeople from Yangzhou
Footballers from Jiangsu
Chinese footballers
China youth international footballers
Chinese expatriate footballers
Association football goalkeepers
China League One players
Jiangsu F.C. players
Gondomar S.C. players
Tianjin Jinmen Tiger F.C. players
Meizhou Hakka F.C. players
Chinese expatriate sportspeople in Portugal
Expatriate footballers in Portugal